Anthropoid means 'ape/human feature' and may refer to:

Simian, monkeys and apes (anthropoids, or suborder Anthropoidea, in earlier classifications)
Anthropoid apes, apes that are closely related to humans (e.g., former family Pongidae and sometimes also Hylobatidae and their extinct relatives)
Anthropoides, a genus of cranes
Operation Anthropoid, the codename for the assassination of Reinhard Heydrich, SS-Obergruppenführer and Reichsprotektor of Bohemia and Moravia
Operation Anthropoid Memorial, Libeň, Prague, Czech Republic
Anthropoid (film), a 2016 film based on Operation Anthropoid
In pelvimetry, one of four types of human female pelvis
Anthropoid animals, fictional creatures in the Japanese visual novel game Wanko to Kurasō
Anthropoid robots, mostly referred to as androids meaning human-like robots

See also

Anthropology
Anthrobotics
Anthropod (disambiguation)
Arthropod, the animal phylum including insects, arachnids, and crustaceans
Humanoid